Finnur Kolbeinsson (born 21 March 1972) is a retired Icelandic semi-professional football midfielder who made over 200 appearances for Fylkir. He also played in Malta and Belgium and was capped by Iceland at international level.

Club career 
A midfielder, Finnur made 287 appearances and scored 36 goals across three spells for Fylkir in his native Iceland between 1989 and 2005. He won the Icelandic Cup and three 1. deild karla championships with the club. Earlier in his career he also played in Malta and Belgium for Hibernians and KSV Bornem respectively.

International career 
Finnur won 15 caps and scored two goals for Iceland at youth level and won a single cap for the senior team, as a late substitute for Baldur Þór Bjarnason in a 1–0 friendly defeat to the United States on 31 August 1993.

Personal life 
Finnur is the father of footballer Kolbeinn Finnsson.

Honours 
Fylkir

 1. deild karla (3): 1992, 1995, 1999
Icelandic Cup (2): 2001, 2002
Reykjavik Tournament (1): 2001

Individual

Úrvalsdeild Player of the Year: 2002

Career statistics

References

External links

1972 births
Living people
Finnur Kolbeinsson
Association football midfielders
Finnur Kolbeinsson
Finnur Kolbeinsson
Finnur Kolbeinsson
Finnur Kolbeinsson
Finnur Kolbeinsson
Icelandic expatriate sportspeople in Malta
Finnur Kolbeinsson
Finnur Kolbeinsson
Finnur Kolbeinsson
Hibernians F.C. players
Maltese Premier League players
Expatriate footballers in Malta
Expatriate footballers in Belgium